The Czechoslovakia men's national ice hockey team was the national ice hockey team of Czechoslovakia, and competed from 1920 until 1992. The successor to the Bohemia national ice hockey team, which was a European power prior to World War I, the Czechoslovak national team first appeared at the 1920 Summer Olympics, two years after the creation of the state. In the 1940s, they established themselves as the best team in Europe, becoming the first team from the continent to win two World Championships (1947 and 1949). After the arrival of the Soviet Union on the international hockey scene in the 1950s, the Czechoslovaks regularly fought Sweden and Canada for silver and bronze medals, and sometimes beat the Soviets. In total, they won the gold medal six times.

Due to the split of the country Czechoslovakia into the Czech Republic and Slovakia, the team was replaced in 1993 with the Czech and the Slovak national teams. The International Ice Hockey Federation (IIHF) recognized the Czech national team as a successor of Czechoslovakia national team and kept it in the top group, while the Slovak national team was entered into the lowest level, Pool C, winning promotion in successive years to join the elite division in 1996.

Notable events
First game: 24 April 1920, Antwerp:  15–0 
Last game: 19 December 1992, Moscow:  7–2 
Largest victory:
3 February 1939, Basel:  24–0 
21 February 1947, Prague:  24–0 
25 April 1951, East Berlin:  27–3 
4 March 1957, Moscow:  25–1 
Largest defeat: 28 January 1924, Chamonix:  30–0 
Plane crash on 8 November 1948. Six players on the way to an exhibition tour in the UK were killed in the crash of a charter flight from Paris to London.

Notable players
Mike Buckna
Ladislav Troják
Ján Starší
Jaroslav Drobný
Vladimír Dzurilla
Jozef Golonka
Dominik Hašek
Ivan Hlinka
Jiří Holeček
Jan Hrdina
František Kaberle Sr.
Karel Koželuh
Igor Liba
Vincent Lukáč
Josef Maleček
Vladimír Martinec
Václav Nedomanský
Milan Nový
Dušan Pašek
Jan Peka
František Pospíšil
Jaroslav Pouzar
Dárius Rusnák
Vladimír Růžička
Marián Šťastný
Peter Šťastný
Jan Suchý
František Tikal

Former National jerseys

Olympic record

Canada Cup record

European Championship record

World Championship record

See also
 Czech Republic men's national ice hockey team
 Slovakia men's national ice hockey team
 Protectorate of Bohemia and Moravia men's national ice hockey team
 Bohemia national ice hockey team
List of accidents involving sports teams

References

 
 
Former national ice hockey teams in Europe
Men's sport in Czechoslovakia